Märt Visnapuu (born on 23 April 1962 in Tallinn) is an Estonian actor.

In 1984 he graduated from the Tallinn State Conservatory's Performing Arts Department. from 1984 until 1992, he was an actor at the Estonian Drama Theatre, and from 1993 until 1996, at Ugala Theatre. Since 1996 he has been a freelance actor. Besides theatre roles he has played also in several films and television series.

Filmography

 1983: Küljetuul
 1984: Hundiseaduse aegu
 1991: Vana mees tahab koju
 1998: Kired
 2011: Surnuaiavahi tütar

References

Living people
1962 births
Estonian male stage actors
Estonian male film actors
Estonian male television actors
20th-century Estonian male actors
21st-century Estonian male actors
Estonian Academy of Music and Theatre alumni
Male actors from Tallinn